The 1971 College Football All-America team is composed of college football players who were selected as All-Americans by various organizations and writers that chose College Football All-America Teams in 1971. The National Collegiate Athletic Association (NCAA) recognizes five selectors as "official" for the 1971 season. They are: (1) the American Football Coaches Association (AFCA), (2) the Associated Press (AP), (3) the Football Writers Association of America (FWAA), (4) the Newspaper Enterprise Association (NEA), and (5) the United Press International (UPI).

Nine players are recognized by the NCAA as unanimous All-America selections: quarterback and 1971 Heisman Trophy winner Pat Sullivan of Auburn; running backs Ed Marinaro of Cornell and Greg Pruitt of Oklahoma; receiver Terry Beasley of Auburn; tackle Jerry Sisemore of Texas; guard Royce Smith of Georgia; defensive end Walt Patulski of Notre Dame; linebacker Mike Taylor of Michigan; and defensive back Bobby Majors of Tennessee.

Consensus All-Americans
The following chart identifies the NCAA-recognized consensus All-Americans for the year 1971 and displays which first-team designations they received.

Offense

Receivers 

 Terry Beasley, Auburn (AFCA, AP-1, FWAA, NEA-1, UPI-1, FN, Time, TSN, WC)
 Johnny Rodgers, Nebraska (AFCA, AP-2, FWAA, NEA-1, UPI-1, FN, WC)
 Mike Siani, Villanova (NEA-2, UPI-2, TSN)
 Tom Gatewood, Notre Dame (UPI-2, Time)
 Cliff Branch, Colorado (FN)
 Rhett Dawson, Florida State (AP-3)

Tight ends 

 Riley Odoms, Houston (AP-3, NEA-2 [receiver], Time, TSN)
 Doug Kingsriter, Minnesota (AP-1)
 Charles Young, USC (AP-2)

Tackles 

 Jerry Sisemore, Texas (AFCA, AP-1, FWAA, NEA-1, UPI-1, FN, WC)
 Dave Joyner, Penn State (AFCA, AP-2, FWAA, NEA-2, UPI-1, FN, WC)
 John Vella, USC (AP-1, NEA-1, UPI-2, FN, TSN)
 John Hannah, Alabama (AFCA, UPI-2)
 Tom Drougas, Oregon (TSN)
 Lionel Antoine, Southern Illinois (Time)
 Tom Luken, Purdue (AP-2, NEA-2 [OG])
 Carl Johnson, Nebraska (AP-3)
 Mike Stark, Memphis State (AP-3)

Guards 

 Reggie McKenzie, Michigan (AP-1, FWAA, NEA-1, UPI-1, FN, Time, TSN, WC)
 Royce Smith, Georgia (AFCA, AP-1, FWAA, NEA-1, UPI-1, FN, Time, TSN, WC)
 Gordon Gravelle, BYU (AP-2, NEA-2)
 John Hannah, Alabama (AP-2)
 Dick Rupert, Nebraska (AP-3, UPI-2)
 B. C. Williams, West Virginia (AP-3)
 Ken Jones, Oklahoma (UPI-2)

Centers 

 Tom Brahaney, Oklahoma (AFCA, AP-1, FWAA, UPI-2, FN, WC)
 Tom DeLeone, Ohio State (AP-2, NEA-1, UPI-1, FN, Time, TSN)
 Dave Dalby, UCLA (AP-3, NEA-2, TSN)

Quarterbacks 

 Pat Sullivan, Auburn (AFCA, AP-1, FWAA, NEA-1, UPI-1, FN, TSN, WC)
 Chuck Ealey, Toledo, (AP-3, FWAA, UPI-2, FN)
 Jerry Tagge, Nebraska (AP-2, FN)
 Jack Mildren, Oklahoma (NEA-2, FN)
 John Reaves, Florida (Time)

Running backs 

 Ed Marinaro, Cornell (AFCA, AP-1, FWAA, NEA-1, UPI-1, FN, Time, TSN)
 Greg Pruitt, Oklahoma (AFCA, AP-1, FWAA, NEA-1, UPI-1, FN, WC)
 Johnny Musso, Alabama (AFCA, AP-2, FWAA, NEA-2, UPI-1, FN, WC)
 Ahmad Rashad (born Bobby Moore), Oregon (AP-3, NEA-1, UPI-2, FN, Time, TSN)
 Lydell Mitchell, Penn State (AP-1, NEA-2, UPI-2, FN)
 Eric Allen, Michigan State (AFCA, AP-2, NEA-2)
 Billy Taylor, Michigan (AP-3, UPI-2, FN)
 Robert Newhouse, Houston (AP-2)
 Jeff Kinney, Nebraska (AP-3)

Defense

Defensive ends 

 Walt Patulski, Notre Dame (AFCA, AP-1, FWAA, NEA-1, UPI-1, FN, Time, TSN, WC)
 Willie Harper, Nebraska (AP-2, NEA-1, UPI-1, FN, WC)
 Smylie Gebhart, Georgia Tech (AP-1)
 Robin Parkhouse, Alabama (AP-2, NEA-2, UPI-2)
 Junior Ah You, Arizona State (UPI-2)
 Mike Keller, Michigan (AP-3)
 Gene Ogilvie, Air Force (AP-3)

Defensive tackles 

 Larry Jacobson, Nebraska (AFCA, AP-1, FWAA, NEA-2 [OT], UPI-1, Time)
 Mel Long, Toledo  (AP-1, FWAA, NEA-1, UPI-1)
 Sherman White, California (AFCA, AP-2, FWAA, NEA-1, FN, Time, TSN, WC)
 Herb Orvis, Colorado (AFCA, AP-3, NEA-2 [DE], UPI-2, TSN [DE], WC)
 Mike Kadish, Notre Dame (Time, TSN)
 Ron Estay, LSU (AFCA [guard], AP-2, NEA-2 [MG], UPI-2)
 Pete Lazetich, Stanford (NEA-2, FN)

Middle guards 

 Rich Glover, Nebraska (AP-1, NEA-1, WC)
 Ron Curl, Michigan State (AFCA, AP-3, NEA-2)
 Doug Krause, Miami (OH) (AP-2)
 Bud Magrum, Colorado (AP-3)

Linebackers 

 Mike Taylor, Michigan (AFCA, AP-1, FWAA, NEA-1, UPI-1, FN, Time, TSN, WC)
 Jeff Siemon, Stanford (AFCA, AP-1, FWAA, UPI-1, FN, Time)
 Jackie Walker, Tennessee (FWAA, NEA-2, UPI-1, FN, WC)
 Dave Chaney, San Jose State (AP-1, NEA-1, UPI-2)
 Willie Hall, Southern California (AP-2, UPI-2, Time, TSN, FN)
 Chuck Zapiec, Penn State (AP-3, NEA-1)
 Mark Arneson, Arizona (TSN)
Rodrigo Barnes, Rice (UPI-2)
 Ralph Cindrich, Pittsburgh (AP-2, NEA-2)
 Joe Federspiel, Kentucky (AP-2)
 Steve Aycock, Oklahoma (UPI-2)
 Bill Light, Minnesota (AP-3)
 Harold Sears, Miami (FL) (AP-3)

Defensive backs 

 Bobby Majors, Tennessee (AFCA, AP-1, FWAA, NEA-1, UPI-1, FN, Time, TSN, WC)
 Clarence Ellis, Notre Dame (AFCA, AP-1, NEA-1, UPI-1, FN, Time, TSN, WC)
 Tommy Casanova, LSU (FWAA, UPI-1, FN, Time, WC)
 Ernie Jackson, Duke (AFCA, AP-2, FWAA)
 Brad Van Pelt, Michigan State (AP-3, UPI-1, FN)
 Willie Buchanon, San Diego State (NEA-2, Time, TSN)
 Thom Darden, Michigan (AFCA, AP-2, UPI-2, TSN)
 Eric Hutchinson, Northwestern (FWAA, NEA-2, UPI-2)
 Dickie Harris, South Carolina (UPI-2, WC)
 Craig Clemons, Iowa (NEA-1, TSN)
 Windlan Hall, Arizona State (AP-3, NEA-2 [LB], UPI-2, FN)
 Tom Myers, Syracuse (AP-1)
 Robert Popelka, SMU (AP-2)
 Ralph McGill, Tulsa (AP-3, NEA-2)

Special teams

Kickers 

 Bill McClard, Arkansas (FWAA TSN)
 Chester Marcol, Hillsdale College (Time)

Punters 

 Marv Bateman, Utah (TSN, Time)

Key 

 Bold – Consensus All-American
 -1 – First-team selection
 -2 – Second-team selection
 -3 – Third-team selection

Official selectors
 AFCA – American Football Coaches Association for Kodak
 AP – Associated Press
 FWAA – Football Writers Association of America
 NEA – Newspaper Enterprise Association
 UPI – United Press International

Other selectors
 FN – Football News
 Time – Time magazine
 TSN – The Sporting News
 PFW – Pro Football Weekly
 WC – Walter Camp Football Foundation

See also
 1971 All-Atlantic Coast Conference football team
 1971 All-Big Eight Conference football team
 1971 All-Big Ten Conference football team
 1971 All-Pacific-8 Conference football team
 1971 All-SEC football team
 1971 All-Southwest Conference football team

References 

All-America Team
College Football All-America Teams